Factual film may refer to:

 Historical film
 Biographical film, a film that dramatizes the life of a non-fictional or historically-based person or people
 Film based on a true story
 Documentary film, a nonfictional motion picture intended to document some aspect of reality, primarily for the purposes of instruction, education, or maintaining a historical record

See also
 Nonfiction